The Stones is an American sitcom television series that starred Robert Klein, Judith Light, Lindsay Sloane and Jay Baruchel as the Stone family that are divorced but still live under the same roof. The show premiered on CBS on March 17, 2004 and was canceled after three episodes had aired. It was produced by David Kohan, Max Mutchnick and Jenji Kohan.

Cast
Robert Klein...Stan Stone
Judith Light....Barbara Stone	
Lindsay Sloane....Karly Stone	
Jay Baruchel....Winston Stone

Episodes

Response
Robert Bianco of USA Today gave it 1.5 stars out of four. "This barrage of sullen sex jokes are a family affair in more ways than one." New York Times said "But The Stones ultimately misses the potential in the clash of idioms it establishes "

References

2000s American sitcoms
CBS original programming
2004 American television series debuts
2004 American television series endings
English-language television shows
Television series by Warner Bros. Television Studios
Television series created by Jenji Kohan